The Shirt Tails were a mid-19th-century street gang based in the Five Points slum in Manhattan, New York, United States, who wore their shirts on the outside of their pants as 19th-century Chinese laborers would dress as a form of insignia and as a sign of gang group affiliation. Members kept their weapons—as many as three or four at a time—concealed beneath their shirts; this discreet measure stands in contrast to competing gangs who flaunted their weapons in order to intimidate.

Never numbering more than a few hundred members, the Shirt Tails, like many other gangs, disappeared shortly before the American Civil War (although they did participate in a coalition of gangs under the Dead Rabbits and fought against the Bowery Boys during the New York Draft Riots), with its remaining members dissipating or joining other Irish gangs.

References
Asbury, Herbert. The Gangs of New York. New York: Alfred A. Knoff Inc., 1927. 

Former gangs in New York City
Irish-American gangs

19th century in New York City